The 2003 South Asian Football Federation Gold Cup is an international football tournament held in Bangladesh from 10 January to 20 January 2003. The eight national teams involved in the tournament were required to register a squad of 23 players, including three goalkeepers. Only players in these squads were eligible to take part in the tournament.

Group A

India

Coach:  Stephen Constantine
Naseem Akhtar
Rajat Ghosh Dastidar
Virender Singh
Roberto Fernandes
Selwyn Fernandes 
Debjit Ghosh
Samir Naik
Muttath Suresh
Jules Alberto
Jo Paul Ancheri
Subhash Chakraborty
Abhay Kumar
Climax Lawrence
Renedy Singh
Shanmugam Venkatesh
Ashim Biswas
Alvito D'Cunha
Harvinder Singh
IM Vijayan
Abhishek Yadav

Sri Lanka
Coach:  Marcus Fereira
Sandun Devinda
Dammika Senarath
Dudley Lincoln Steinwall
KM Fuard
Nalind Nandana Kurmara
Samantha Prabath
Rukman Rishantha
Janaka Sanjaya Silva
Gihan Janaka
Imran Mohammed
Mohamed Rawme Mohideen
Chathura Maduranga Weerasinghe
Chryshantha Abeysekera
M Azmeer
EIP Perera
MH Mohamed Hamsa

Pakistan
Coach:  Tariq Lutfi
Jaffar Khan
Abdul Ghani
Haroon Yousaf
Tanveer Ahmed
Muhammad Sameen
Amir Shahzad
Sajjad Haider
Sarfraz Rasool
Zakir Hussain
Sajjad Hussain
Ashfaq Ahmed
Ayaz Muhammad
Muhammad Niaz
Qadeer Ahmed
Shahid Saleem
Zahid Niaz
Khuda Bux
M Nawaz
Fareed Majeed
M Amir Khan

Afghanistan
Coach:  Holger Obermann
Jamshid
Abdul Salem Jamshid
Rahil Ahmad Fourmoli
Najib Naderi
Omar Azhar
Ahmad Zia Azimi
Rollah
Omar Nazar
Reza Rezai
Obaidullah
Sayed Tahir Shah
Basir Kamrani
Ali Danish

Group B

Bangladesh
Coach:  George Kottan
Biplob Bhattacharjee
Aminul Haque
Rajani Kanta Barman
Kazi Nazrul Islam
Mohammed Sujan
Mahmudul Hasan
 Hassan Al-Mamun
Firoz Mahmud Titu 
Rokonuzzaman Kanchan
Abdul Qaiyum Sentu
Mohammed Monwar Hossain
Arman Mia
Arif Khan Joy
Mustafa Anwar Parvez Babu
Saifur Rahman Moni
Motiur Rahman Munna
Alfaz Ahmed
Mehedi Hasan Ujjal
Ariful Kabir Farhad
Saiful Islam Saif

Bhutan
Coach:   Henk Walk
Jigme Singhe
Puspalal Sharma
Passang Tshering
Irishna Subba
Bhim Kumar Chhetri
Kinley Dorji
Wangay Dorji
Dorji Khandu
Chengho
Sonam Tobgye
Sonam Tenzin
Dinesh Chhetri
Pema Chophel
Sonam Jamtsho
Ygyen
Namey
Tenzin

Maldives
Coach:  Jozef Jankech
Mohamed Jameel
Aslam Abdul Raheem
Mohamed Nizam
Ali Shiyam
Mohamed Areesh
Asad Abdul Ganee
Ali Umar
Abdullah Ibrahim
Ismail Naseem
Ibrahim Fazeel
Adam Abdul Latheef
Fareed Mohamed
Ahmed Naaz
Mohamed
Hussain Luthfee
Mohamed Hussain
Shah Ismail
Ishaq Easa
Ibrahim Sagib
Hassan Nadheem
Ismail Mohamed
Ahmed Janah
Ibrahim Amil
Ahmed Niyaz
Ahmed Thoha
Ahmed Thoriq

Nepal
Coach:  Yoo Kee-heung
Upendra Man Singh
Chhannu Ram Chaudhary
Rajkumar KC
Sagar Thapa
Dev Narayan Chaudhary
Rakesh Shrestha
Narayan Manandhar
Narottam Gautam
Janak Singh
Rajesh Shah
Nabin Neupane
Deepak Lama
Basanta Gauchan
Sunil Tuladhar
Balgopal Maharjan
Rajkumar Shrestha
Kumar Thapa
Ananta Thapa
Rajan Rayamajhi
Surendra Tamang
Sukra Tamang
Ramesh Budathoki
Hari Khadka
Basanta Thapa
Nirajan Rayamajhi

References

SAFF Championship
Association football tournament squads
SAFF Championship squads